The 6th Danube Guards Rifle Corps was a Rifle Corps of the Soviet Armed Forces during World War II. During the war, it formed part of the 8th, 2nd Shock, 1st Guards, 46th, 37th, and 57th Armies.

History

The corps was part of the 'operational army' from 28 March to 13 October 1942, and 5 November 1942 to 9 May 1945.

During the fighting in Volkhov, the corps did not see combat. In the summer, in anticipation of the Sinyavino offensive, the Corps built several new connections and relocated slightly to the north. In September 1942 the Corps was involved in the Sinyavino offensive. The Corps were put into action as part of the Leningrad massacre on 27 August 1942. The offensive corps, in the early days of developing successfully, crossed the river black, broke through the first line of defence at the junction of the 227th and 223rd infantry divisions. After two days of the approach to the Sinyavino, the 3rd Guards Rifle Division launched an attack on the labour camp № 5, 24th and began moving to the lake Sinyavinskaya, where the 19th attacked directly on Sinyavino. The corps was unsuccessful in making any further advance, soon was surrounded, and suffered heavy losses on 27 September 1942, derived from the achieved positions near Sinyavino. In October 1942, the Corps headquarters was transferred to Reserve of the Supreme High Command (Stavka Reserve).

During its second formation, the Corps was led by amongst others, Grigory Kotov (December 1943 - November 1944) and Stepan Morozov (November 1944 - March 1945).

Postwar, the 6th Guards Rifle Corps was moved to Romania along with the 57th Army. The 20th Guards Rifle Division became the 25th Guards Mechanized Division and was stationed at Giurgiu. The 61st Guards Rifle Division was stationed at Brănești. The 10th Guards Airborne Division became the 126th Guards Rifle Division and was stationed at Buda. In December 1946, the corps was disbanded, along with the 61st and 126th Guards Rifle Divisions.

References

 

G006
Military units and formations established in 1942
Military units and formations disestablished in 1946